was a Japanese animation label for Access-A INC. (株式会社アクセスエー) beginning in 2003, specializing in the production of hentai OVAs. It is a subdivision of Japanese corporation Happinet, owned by Bandai Namco Holdings.

As of July 3, 2006, the official site announced the closure of its site on July 31, 2006. Access-A INC. later abandoned the Green Bunny label sometime later, before November 2006. Some Green Bunny titles were later published by MS Pictures.

Titles
The following is a list of notable titles from Green Bunny. Some of the Green Bunny releases are licensed by Anime Works by removing all of the sex scenes, but not the nudity.

1997–1999

2000–2005

Re-releases

MS Pictures releases
Square of the MOON
Genmukan ~Aiyoku to Ryojoku no Inzai~
Sexfriend
Words Worth Ultimate Pack 02
Words Worth Ultimate Pack 01
Daiakuji
HO TA RU KO
Natural2 -Duo- Kumiko & Hinami Pack
Natural2 -Duo- Chisato & Kuu Pack
Maid in Heaven SuperS
Gakuen Sodom the guilty party
Nikutaiteni
Tsubaki-iro no Prigione Complete Edition
Kuroai.
él Complete Edition
Pure Mail
'Kowaremono' II Complete Edition
SeeIn AO Complete Edition
Midnight Panther Complete Edition
Natural Complete Edition
Natural Another Complete Edition
Orchid Emblem fukkokuban
La Blue*Girl fukkakuhen Complete Edition Vol.2
La Blue*Girl fukkakuhen Complete Edition Vol.1
Advancer Tina
Space Ofera Agga Ruter Complete Edition VOL.1
Space Ofera Agga Ruter Complete Edition VOL.2
G-Taste Yagisawa Moe. Morimura Nana.Kannazuki Mai hen
G-Taste Mizukoshi Sayaka.Kawamura Misuzu. Senou Asuka. Shingyouji Yuna hen

Plots In Green Bunny Hentai
Daiakuji - The Xena Buster
After getting released from prison, Akuji Yamamoto noticed that the world is a totally different place During his imprisonment, the hierarchal structure flipped upside down, making it a world where the women dominated over men. Militia, churches, businesses and private businesses are operated by a female figure. Men were powerless, being controlled and enslaved by the women in Osaka. Being angered by the situation, Akuji and his partner Satsu begin their payback by teaching the stuck-up girls in Osaka a little lesson.

Body Transfer
Kenichi and several of his classmates friends stay after school to look at a new archaeological find, a bizarre looking mirror. Suddenly, the entire school is transported to an alternate dimension and a magic field surrounds it to prevent them from escaping. Also, their minds have switched to other people's bodies. The only way to switch bodies is when their sexual emotions are high. Kenichi must find a way to return everything back to normal until the dimension falls apart.

Sex Demon Queen
Kuri and Linna, a pair of two beautiful and deadly sorceresses, live in an age when all manner of unclean beasts and demons wreak havoc on the general population as they seek to gratify their unquenchable lust. Kuri has dedicated her magic to stopping these foul beasts, though her partner would rather cavort with these demons than kill them. However, this odd couple won't stand for rape, and as they rescue a damsel in distress, they are noticed by the Sex Demon Queen, who seeks to have them as her own. Since they resist, the Queen unleashes all the lust within Linna and Kuri, who become powerless to stop their voracious appetites.

References

External links
 
Access-A INC. Green Bunny Page
MS Pictures Green Bunny Page
MS Pictures Green Bunny Product Page

Anime companies
Hentai companies
Green Bunny
Bandai Namco Holdings